The fourth season of The Great Australian Bake Off premiered on 18 January 2018. The series moved from Lifestyle Food to the main LifeStyle channel.

The Bakers
The following is the list of the bakers that are competing this season:
{| class="wikitable" style="text-align:center"
|-
! style="background:skyblue" "color:black;"| Baker
! style="background:skyblue" "color:black;"| Age 
! style="background:skyblue" "color:black;"| Occupation 
! style="background:skyblue" "color:black;"| Hometown
! style="background:skyblue" "color:black;"| Competition status
|-
| Claudia Anton
| 48
| Psychiatrist
| Melbourne, Victoria
| style="background:gold"| Season winner
|-
| Barbara "Barb" Dunn
| 37
| Finance manager
| Brisbane, Queensland
| style="background:limegreen"| Season runner-up
|-
| Dave Yan
| 35
| Chartered Accountant
| Sydney, New South Wales
| style="background:limegreen"| Season runner-up
|-
| Christopher "Chris" Asquith
| 32
| System administrator
| Newcastle, New South Wales
| style="background:tomato"| Eliminated (Episode 9)
|-
| Raeesa Khatree
| 37
| Health store worker 
| Brisbane, Queensland
| style="background:tomato"| Eliminated (Episode 8)
|-
| Robert Harwood
| 34
| I.T. administrator
| Perth, Western Australia
| style="background:tomato"| Eliminated (Episode 7)
|-
| Marcus Matear
| 27
| Dentist
| Melbourne, Victoria
| style="background:tomato"| Eliminated (Episode 6)
|-
| Michelle Trevorrow
| 64
| Retiree
| Melbourne, Victoria
| style="background:tomato"| Eliminated (Episode 5)
|-
| Emma Sievwright 
| 23
| Science graduate 
| Brisbane, Queensland
| style="background:tomato"| Eliminated (Episode 4)
|-
| Max Fetiveau
| 28
| Plasterer
| Brisbane, Queensland
| style="background:tomato"| Eliminated (Episode 3)
|-
| Alexander "Alex" Papadopoulos 
| 47
| Building material importer 
| Melbourne, Victoria
| style="background:tomato"| Eliminated (Episode 2)
|-
| Jessica Osborne
| 28
| Sales co-ordinator
| Brisbane, Queensland
| style="background:tomato"| Eliminated (Episode 1)
|}

Results summary

Colour key:

Episodes

Episode 1: Cakes

Episode 2: Bread

Episode 3: Biscuits

Episode 4: Family Favourites

Episode 5: Pastry

Episode 6: Batter

Episode 7: Desserts

Episode 8: British

Episode 9: Celebrations

Episode 10: Final

Ratings

References

2018 Australian television seasons
4